Frederick William Stinchcombe (12 March 1930 – 19 September 1984) was an English cricketer.  Stinchcombe was a right-handed batsman who bowled leg break googly.  He was born at Barnby Moor, Nottinghamshire.

Stinchcombe made his first-class debut for Nottinghamshire against Hampshire in the 1950 County Championship.  He made five further first-class appearances for the county, the last of which came against Kent in the 1951 County Championship.  In his six first-class appearances for the county, he scored 87 runs at an average of 14.50, with a high score of 48.  With the ball, he took 4 wickets at an expensive bowling average of 134.75, with best figures of 1/42.

He died at Worksop, Nottinghamshire, on 19 September 1984.

References

External links
Frederick Stinchcombe at ESPNcricinfo
Frederick Stinchcombe at CricketArchive

1930 births
1984 deaths
People from Barnby Moor
Cricketers from Nottinghamshire
English cricketers
Nottinghamshire cricketers